beta-Ergocryptine (β-ergocryptine) is an ergoline alkaloid.  It is one of the two isomers of ergocryptine.  It was first identified in 1967 by Albert Hofmann as a component of a mixture obtained from ergot fungi.  Ergot from different sources have different ratios of the two isomers.

References

Indolizidines
Lactams
Ergot alkaloids